"Autumn" is a three-part song by English band Strawbs featured on their 1974 album Hero and Heroine. The final part "The Winter Long" was released as a single in 1974 under the title "Hold on to Me (The Winter Long)".

Heroine's Theme

The first part of the three part song is an instrumental written by keyboardist John Hawken. It was later released as a single in the United States due to demand from black radio stations. The music begins with a menacing riff played on a Moog synthesizer, gradually builds to a climax and then segues into the much quieter second part of the song.

Deep Summer Sleep

"Deep Summer Sleep" is written and sung by Dave Cousins.

The Winter Long

The final part of the song is written by Dave Cousins but sung by Dave Lambert. It was released as a single in the UK in 1974. Several overseas releases followed.

Release history

B-side of the single

The B-side track "Where Do You Go (When You Need a Hole to Crawl In)" is a Dave Cousins composition, featured on the 1974 album Ghosts album.

Personnel

Dave Cousins – lead vocals, backing vocals, acoustic guitar
Dave Lambert – lead vocals, backing vocals, electric guitar
Chas Cronk – backing vocals, bass guitar
Rod Coombes – drums
John Hawken – piano, Mellotron, organ, synthesizer

References
"Hold on to Me" at Strawbsweb

External links
Lyrics to "Autumn" at Strawbsweb
Lyrics to "Where Do You Go" at Strawbsweb

1974 singles
Strawbs songs
1974 songs
Songs written by Dave Cousins